"Life Goes On" is a song recorded by American country music group Little Texas.  It was released in August 1995 as the first single from the band's Greatest Hits compilation album.  The song was co-written by the band's drummer, Del Gray and songwriters Thom McHugh and Keith Follesé.  Life Goes On was Little Texas's thirteenth entry on the Billboard charts, peaking at #5 on the Hot Country Songs chart and reaching #4 on Canada's RPM country tracks chart. It would be their last single to make it to the Top 40.

Content
"Life Goes On" is an uptempo song in the band's characteristic harmonizing style. The song's lyrics are simple in that the narrator remembers a lost love and basically sums up his feelings with "I miss ya honey but life goes on."

Music video
The music video was directed by Gerry Wenner and premiered in September 1995. It was filmed on August 8, 1995, and features the band playing the song at a bar with a pool table, while clips from their previous music videos are shown.

Chart performance
"Life Goes On" debuted at #59 on the U.S. Billboard Hot Country Singles & Tracks for the week of September 2, 1995.

Year-end charts

References

1995 singles
Little Texas (band) songs
Songs written by Keith Follesé
Song recordings produced by James Stroud
Warner Records singles
1995 songs
Songs written by Thom McHugh